Brachybamus is a genus of marsh weevils in the beetle family Brachyceridae. There are at least three described species in Brachybamus.

Species
The following three species belong to the genus Brachybamus:
 Brachybamus electus Germar, 1835
 Brachybamus inceratus Boheman, 1843
 Brachybamus pipitzi Faust, 1888

References

Further reading

 
 

Brachyceridae
Articles created by Qbugbot